The Ogun River is a waterway in Nigeria that discharges into the Lagos Lagoon.

Course and usage

The river rises in Sepeteri Oyo State near Shaki at coordinates  and flows through Ogun State into Lagos State.
The river is crossed by the Ikere Gorge Dam in the Iseyin local government area of Oyo State.
The reservoir abuts the Old Oyo National Park, providing recreational facilities for tourists, and the river flows through the park.
The Ofiki River, which also rises near Shaki, is the Ogun River's chief tributary.
The Oyan River, another tributary, is crossed by the Oyan River Dam which supplies water to Abeokuta and Lagos.
In densely populated areas the river is used for bathing, washing and drinking. It also serves as a drain for mostly organic wastes from abattoirs located along the river's course.

History

In the Yoruba religion, Yemoja is the divinity of the Ogun River. 
The catechist Charles Phillips, father of the Charles Phillips who later became Bishop of Ondo, wrote in 1857 that the Ogun River was generally worshipped by the people who live along its banks from its rise until where it empties into the lagoon.
The river ran through the heart of the old Oyo Empire. Metropolitan Oyo was divided into six provinces with three on the west side of the Ogun River and three to the river's east.
At one time, the river formed an important route for traders carrying goods by canoe between Abeokuta and the Lagos Colony.

Gallery

References

Rivers of Nigeria
Rivers of Yorubaland
Oyo State
Ogun State
Rivers of Lagos
Waterways in Lagos